Bruce Hall is a residential college of the Australian National University (ANU), in Canberra, Australia. Opened in 1961, the original Bruce Hall was a campus landmark and housed both the first undergraduate hall of residence at the university and the first in Australia to admit both men and women. The college has produced notable alumni across a range of fields.

The Hall's motto is "Felix Qui Potuit Rerum Cognoscere Causas" which means "Happy is he who is able to discover the reason for things".

In April 2017, following an extended battle against alumni and heritage groups, the ANU obtained final approval for demolition of Bruce Hall's historic buildings. Alumni condemned the decision.

In February 2019 the ANU opened the renewed Bruce Hall alongside a new residence, Wright Hall, both on the site of the original residence.

Description

Bruce Hall is located on the campus of the Australian National University, along Daley Road, in the Dickson Precinct. It currently consists of a seven-storey building containing the Dining Hall, and a separate four-storey Packard Wing housing postgraduates and older undergraduates.

Among Bruce Hall's facilities are four common rooms, music rooms, an arts room, laundry room, various function rooms, tutorial rooms, a common kitchen, a computer lab and a library. Bruce Hall also runs a Buttery which sells snacks and  beverages to residents.

Meals, as well as major functions, are held in the Bill Packard Dining Hall, which is also notable for being home to Leonard French's Seven Days of Creation series.

Catered Wings
The catered wings are generally occupied by undergraduate students of the Australian National University.

Self-Catered Wing
The Packard wing provides studios, both single and double occupancy, with individual kitchens and bathrooms for postgraduate and later-year undergraduate students.

The Packard wing is predominantly occupied by senior undergraduate students and postgraduate students of the Australian National University.

History

Foundation and development
Bruce Hall is the oldest undergraduate residential hall on the Australian National University campus, being officially opened in 1961 (The oldest resident hall is University House opened in 1954 but exclusively for doctoral students). It originally consisted of just five wings, North, South, East, West and Central.

Bruce Hall was named after the former Prime Minister of Australia Stanley Bruce.

Historian Bill Gammage, an early resident, recalls that the college was opened by Prime Minister Robert Menzies. Gammage told the ABC in 2016: "because it was such a showpiece, a lot of famous visitors were there - the King and Queen of Thailand came at the same time as they opened the Menzies Library, I think the Queen herself might have been there at one time."

The first warden was Bill Packard OAM. He was instrumental in shaping the Hall's culture, developed Inward Bound, the ANU's premier inter-Hall sports event and continued to support the Hall's activities until his death in 2009.

In 1963 Motel Schreinerhof in Northbourne Avenue was taken over as an annexe for Bruce Hall and accommodated woman students until 1965.

A shortcut between Clunies Ross Drive and Daley Road just south of Bruce Hall was closed by students digging a ditch. A petrol tanker became stuck in the ditch. The ANU promised to install concrete posts and turn the area into a garden.

In 1964 a revenge attack from Duntroon cadets smashed doors and windows and caused water damage after a car was set on fire on the Duntroon parade ground.

On 9 July 1965 Princess Alice, Countess of Athlone toured the ANU with a visit to Bruce Hall.

The sculptures in the pond at the front of Bruce Hall that look like egg beaters, were designed by Herbert Flugelman. They were commissioned in 1965 and to be completed in 1967.

Liquor was first sold to students at the hall on 1 June 1970.

The hall's capacity was expanded with the completion of Extension Wing in 1971.

Bruce Hall was audited by the Federated Liquor and Allied Trades Union, as it was accused of breaking the minimum time rule for casual workers. The ANU had claimed it was not subject to rulings of the Conciliation and Arbitration Commission as it was created by its own act of parliament, but later changed its position on the matter.

In 2004, Packard Wing was completed and houses mainly later-year undergraduates and postgraduate students. The Packard Wing was named in honour of Bill Packard OAM, the founding warden.

Demolition battle

In March 2016, The Canberra Times reported that the "Australian National University denies it has plans to demolish the university's oldest undergraduate residential college Bruce Hall as it moves to redevelop the 55-year-old complex to expand the university's student accommodation", but noted fears among alumni that the decision had already been made. The college then stood as a 240-bed catered on-campus residence. A 2012 site inventory of the ANU Acton Campus in 2012 had noted that the original Bruce Hall met the criteria for Commonwealth Heritage.

Alumni mobilised to oppose the ANU's plans. Journalist Karen Hardy, a former resident, wrote of the ANU's proposals in the Fairfax Press: "It's not about being an '800-bed facility', Bruce Hall isn't a hospital, or a prison, or a hotel. It's about giving kids a home, and a heart, and a place they can return to 30 years down the track and realise just how much those two things are intertwined. We can't let them knock it down." Historian Bill Gammage, a former resident, told the ABC that if demolition was even being considered that would be "alarming" because the hall "self evidently has so many advantages in terms of tradition and student comfort and so on". In June 2016, Andrew Hargrave, a former president of the college, also made the case for preservation in the Fairfax press:

The ANU confirmed its plans to demolish the iconic college and replace it with two new higher-density accommodation buildings in September 2016. The ANU had secured funds for replacing Bruce Hall from philanthropist former residents Graham and Louise Tuckwell and funds from the new high-density residences would be channeled to the Tuckwell Scholarship Program.

An alumni association had formed to oppose the ANU's demolition plans, and carried their campaign all the way to the Federal Court. The Bruce Hall Alumni Association argued that the hall had significant social and architectural values and should not be destroyed. The Canberra Times reported on 4 April 2017: "The head of the Bruce Hall Alumni Association says some devastated former residents will never return to the Australian National University after the Federal Court gave the green light for demolition to begin on the residential college."

Demolishing Bruce Hall was also a significant loss for the architectural community, as reported in ArchitectureAu on 7 April 2017:
“It was designed by architect Walter Bunning of Bunning and Madden Architects and completed in 1961. The firm designed a number of public buildings in Canberra and Sydney and won the 1962 Sulman Medal for Liner House in Bridge Street Sydney.

A heritage assessment stated, “Bruce Hall is representative of the late-twentieth century stripped classical style of architecture, as implemented by Bunning and Madden. The building displays several key features of the style including its inherent symmetry and restrained material palette. The building is one [of] few examples of a residential college designed by the firm in Australia and the only one at ANU. “The original furniture in Bruce Hall is representative of the work of the ANU Design Unit headed by Fred Ward, with much of the design work for this building undertaken by Derek Wrigley who went on to become head of the Design Unit.”

ANU's own heritage assessment of Bruce Hall concluded it was of “high” heritage ranking and it “meets the criteria for Commonwealth Heritage List.“

Admissions
Admission to Bruce Hall is through the Australian National University's University Accommodation Services. Prospective residents apply through that office, and are allocated places at the various halls and colleges on the university based on preferences.

Administration
Bruce Hall is administered by the Australian National University's Accommodation Service (UAS) in conjunction with the Facilities and Services Division. The University Accommodation Service appoints a Head of Hall and a Residential Wellbeing Coordinator. Various students are appointed as Community Coordinators and Senior Residential Scholars, who are residents of the hall assisting the administration team in the day-to-day operation of the hall.

Buttery staff are also drawn from residents, who coordinate and staff the buttery during the term, as well as organises events held around the bar, specifically bar nights.

For 2006 Bruce Hall, and the other Halls of Residence at the ANU, were administered under the portfolio of the Pro-Vice Chancellor (University of Community) then held by the current dean of students. However, the arrangement lasted for little more than a year and, in 2007, primary administration of the Hall fell once again to UAS.

Organisations within the hall

Association of Residents
Bruce Hall has an association of residents whereby the objective of the association and the committee are to serve and represent the members in all matters, to promote within the Hall a community spirit by means of cultural, sporting and social events, and to advance the interests of the Hall as a whole.

It stands as the main organising body of the Hall, arranging most of the Hall's cultural, sporting and social events. The committee, an elected group of fourteen residents, is the organising arm of the Association.

The committee also publishes a year book called Ouroboros, encompassing all the activities and events of the year.

The first committee was established in 1961, and has been known under three names since.

Junior Common Room, 1961-2004
The first Bruce Hall association of residents was established in 1961 as the Junior Common Room.

Bruce Hall Residents' Association, 2005-2006
The name of the committee was changed in 2005 with the adoption of a new constitution, with the original intention of a possible incorporation, which did not come to fruition.

The Residents' Association largely carried out similar duties to the original Junior Common Room.

Bruce Hall Common Room, 2006-current
Under directive from the Australian National University legal office in anticipation of Voluntary Student Unionism legislation, at its annual general meeting held on 11 October 2006 the committee removed the word association from its title to avoid any perceived confusion with student unions and renamed itself to the "Bruce Hall Common Room Committee."

Again, the change of name is purely cosmetic, and does not change the method in which the organisation is run.

Learning Communities
Bruce Hall provides Learning Communities for residents who may desire assistance in their areas of learning, as well as other areas of interest. A variety of processes are in place to help residents with university courses, and the advancement of other issues.

There are currently five Learning Communities:
Asia-Pacific
Middle East
Rhetoric
Arts
Sustainability

The learning community also has its own internal publications:
Ignis Draconis, the hall newsletter
Cross-sections, the Bruce Hall Academic Journal, featuring works by residents of the hall.

Bruce Green
Bruce Green is an organisation of individuals interested in environmental and sustainability issues within the hall. Bruce Green also seeks to spread awareness regarding environmental issues via events such as debates and meetings.

Bruce Hall Players
The Bruce Hall Players is a group of residents who produces and acts out an annual Bruce Hall play.
Previous plays include:
1991: The Importance of Being Earnest
1992: Charley's Aunt
1993: The Mouse that Roared
1995: Twelfth Night
1996: Don's Party
1997: Antigone
1998: Picasso at the Lapin Agile
1999: Little Shop of Horrors
2000: Accidental Death of an Anarchist
2001: Kiss Me, Kate
2002: Death By Chocolate
2004: The Highway Man
2005: Psyche and Persephone
2006: Robin Hood, People in Tights
2007: League: The Musical
2008: The Bruce Brothers
2009: Brucegate
2010: Sandora's Box
2011: Grimmly Spectacular [The Brother's Grimm Spectaculathon]
2012: The Book of Everything
2013: Away
2014: The Physicists
2015: Black Coffee
2016: Cosi
2017: Kill Me, Deadly!
2018: Noises Off
2019: The Resistible Rise of Arturo Ui
2020: Romeo and Juliet
2021: Dimity Smyth is Dead
2022: Star Wars: Revenge of the Sith

ANU students performed Everyman in June 1966 in Bruce Hall.

Jodi McAlister, the author of the Bruce Hall plays in 2004, 2005 and 2006, has since written a trilogy of young adult fiction novels, the Valentine series, published by Penguin Australia.

Sports and Arts
Bruce Hall has a tradition in inter-collegiate sports and arts, having won the inter hall sports shield in 1998, 1999 and 2000, and the inter hall arts shield in 2004, 2006 and 2013. In addition to organised sports and arts events run by the inter hall community, the hall also has opportunities for social and informal sports and arts events, as well as inter-wing competitions.

As reflected in the Sports Ethos, the hall prides itself on participation more than success, and places high emphasis on standards of sportsmanship.

A number of residents, both current and former, have proceeded into a higher level of sporting achievement, notably Frank Farina, former national football coach.

Publications

Cross Sections
In 2005 the first edition of Cross Sections: The Bruce Hall Academic Journal was published. The project arose after discussions with residents and then dean Dierdre Pearce. The Journal seeks to be an inter-disciplinary work with both undergraduates, honours students and postgraduates contributing.

Since its inception the Journal has been funded wholly by the university, which ensures all residents receive a copy free of charge each year. Works submitted have been both written and visual pieces with all written works submitted to a University Academic for review. A panel of resident editors is appointed each year to oversee the project.

Since 2006, publishing of Cross Sections has been through Epress the ANU's publishing unit and the work is now available as a free on-line download or in a physical form on a pay-per-copy basis.

Notable alumni

Law:

Stephen Gageler, high court judge.

Business:

Graham Tuckwell, philanthropist.

Literature:

Bill Gammage: writer and historian.
Jodi McAlister: writer and academic.

Sports:

Tal Karp: soccer player, Australian Women's Soccer Team

Public Service: 
Anna Brakey: Commissioner of the Australian Competition and Consumer Commission.

Other Events
Bruce Hall used to house the National Mathematics Summer School every January.

References

External links
Bruce Hall Homepage
University Accommodation Services
Explanation of Name
National Mathematics Summer School at Bruce Hall

Residential colleges of the Australian National University